The 1984 McNeese State Cowboys football team was an American football team that represented McNeese State University as a member of the Southland Conference (Southland) during the 1984 NCAA Division I-AA football season. In their second year under head coach John McCann, the team compiled an overall record of 7–3–1, with a mark of 2–3–1 in conference play, and finished fifth in the Southland.

Schedule

References

McNeese State
McNeese Cowboys football seasons
McNeese State Cowboys football